Osła  is a village in the administrative district of Gmina Gromadka, within Bolesławiec County, Lower Silesian Voivodeship, in south-western Poland.

The village has an approximate population of 415.

During World War II the Germans established and operated a subcamp of the Gross-Rosen concentration camp at the local sanatorium, whose prisoners were mostly Poles. In February 1945, the Germans evacuated the prisoners to the Nordhausen concentration camp, leaving only those unable to walk in the camp. The prisoners remaining in the camp were liberated by Soviet troops. There is a memorial to the victims of the camp in the village.

References

Villages in Bolesławiec County